Stefano Saviozzi (born 4 March 1975 in Pisa) was an Italian rugby union player and is a current coach. He played as a hooker and as a flanker.

Saviozzi first played for Rugby Livorno, from 1994/95 to 1995/96, moving afterwards to Benetton Treviso, where he would play from 1996/97 to 2000/01. He won four Italian Premiership titles, in 1996/97, 1997/98, 1998/99 and 2000/01. He then played two seasons at Rugby Parma, from 2001/02 to 2002/03, one season at Rugby Leonessa 1928, in 2003/04, and another one at Rugby Viadana, in 2004/05. Since 2005/06, he plays for San Marco Rugby, who changed their name for Mogliano Rugby, in 2009/10. He left competition in 2010/11. He has been the coach of the youth squad of Mogliano since 2011/12.

Saviozzi had 14 caps for Italy, from 1998 to 2002, scoring 3 tries, 15 points in aggregate. He was called for the 1999 Rugby World Cup, playing two games but remaining scoreless.

References

External links

1975 births
Living people
Italian rugby union players
Italy international rugby union players
Italian rugby union coaches
Rugby union hookers
Rugby union flankers